This is the list of Pakistan cricket team performance in 2011

Team Performance in 2011 in Tests

Team Performance in 2011 in ODIs

Team Performance in 2011 in T20s

Pakistan Overall Performance in 2011

See also
Pakistan Cricket Team Performance in 2010